Barbara "Bärbel" Martin (born 10 November 1940) is a German former figure skater who represented West Germany. A member of Hamburger EV, she won the 1960 national title and competed at the 1960 Winter Olympics in Squaw Valley, finishing 14th. She also appeared at the World and European Championships. She turned professional in 1961.

Competitive highlights

References 

1940 births
Figure skaters at the 1960 Winter Olympics
Olympic figure skaters of the United Team of Germany
German female single skaters
Living people
Sportspeople from Hamburg
Place of birth missing (living people)